The Scottish Women's Football Championship Cup is an annual knockout competition in Scottish women's football, for teams playing in the SWF Championship, the third tier league below the two-division SWPL. 

Established as part of a reorganisation of the lower leagues in late 2019 and intended to be the early-season cup for a spring-summer-autumn fixture calendar, its first edition in 2020 was played up to the quarter-final stage before being cancelled due to the Covid-19 pandemic in Scotland. The fixture calendar was moved to an autumn-winter-spring schedule to accommodate for restrictions of the pandemic, but even a truncated 2020–21 SWF Championship campaign had to be cancelled and no cup was played. The 2021 Championship Cup therefore coincided with the early part of the 2021–22 SWF Championship season. Its final was played at the Falkirk Stadium on 28 November 2021.

As the cup for third tier clubs, the competition is the equivalent of the Scottish Women's Football League First Division Cup which was first competed for in the 1970s and continued until 2019. However, the Scottish Women's Football League continued after the reorganisation (albeit as a standalone 'Recreational' level separate from the SWPL and Championship at the 'Performance' level) and has its own SWFL League Cup which continues the history of that trophy, with the SWF Championship Cup being a new tournament.

Winners

See also
Scottish Women's Cup
Scottish Women's Premier League Cup
Scottish Women's Football League Cup 
Scottish Challenge Cup (men's equivalent)

References

3
Scottish Women's Football Championship
2020 establishments in Scotland
Recurring sporting events established in 2020